The 2012–13 season is the 45th season of the Northern Premier League Premier Division, and the sixth season of the Northern Premier League Division One North and South. 
The League sponsors for 2012–13 are Evo-Stik.

Due to Step Three leagues increasing their number of teams from 22 to 24 from the 2013–14 season onwards, only two teams will be relegated from the Premier Division, and only one team will be relegated from each of Division One North and South this season.

Premier Division

The Premier Division features six new teams:
AFC Fylde, promoted as champions of NPL Division One North
Blyth Spartans, relegated from Conference North
Eastwood Town, relegated from Conference North
Grantham Town, promoted as champions of NPL Division One South
Ilkeston, promoted via play-offs of NPL Division One South
Witton Albion, promoted via play-offs of NPL Division One North

League table

Play-offs

Semi-finals

Finals

Results grid

Stadia and locations

Division One North

Division One North features four new teams:
Burscough, relegated from the NPL Premier Division
New Mills and Goole, transferred from the NPL Division One South
Ramsbottom United, promoted as champions from the North West Counties League Premier Division

League table

Play-offs

Semifinals

Final

Results grid

Stadia and locations

Division One South

Division One South features six new teams:
Chasetown, relegated from the NPL Premier Division
Gresley, promoted as champions from the Midland Alliance
Halesowen Town, transferred from the Southern League Division One South & West
Mickleover Sports, relegated from the NPL Premier Division
Northwich Victoria, demoted from the NPL Premier Division
King's Lynn Town, promoted as runners-up from the United Counties League Premier Division

League table

Play-offs

Semifinals

Final

Results grid

Stadia and locations

Challenge Cup

The 2012–13 Northern Premier League Challenge Cup (billed as the 2012–13 Doodson Sports Cup for sponsorship reasons) is the 43rd season of the Northern Premier League Challenge Cup, the cup competition of the Northern Premier League.

Calendar

Preliminary round
In the preliminary round, eight teams from the lower regional divisions have been drawn together.

First round
The four clubs which make it through the preliminary round enter into the draw with the rest of the teams from the two Division One leagues which weren't drawn into the preliminary round.

Second round
The 20 clubs which make it through the first round enter into the draw.

Third round 
Teams from the Northern Premier League Premier Division entered at this stage, along with the 10 winners from the second round. The draw for the third round was made on 19 December 2012.

Fourth round
The draw for the fourth round took place on 10 January 2013, with the 16 clubs that made it through the third round.

Source:

Quarter-finals
The eight clubs to have made it through the fourth round were entered into the quarter-finals draw, which took place on 19 February 2013. Cammell Laird, Farsley, and Curzon Ashton from the NPL Division One North and Northwich Victoria from the NPL Division One South remain as the lowest-placed teams still in the Cup.

Source:

Semi-finals
The four clubs to have made it through the quarter finals were entered into the semi-finals draw. The draw for the semi-finals took place on 21 March 2013, with Cammell Laird from the Northern Premier League Division One North remaining as the lowest-placed team still in the Cup.  
Witton Albion was removed from the semi-finals due to fielding an ineligible player on 19 February 2013 against F.C. United of Manchester since the player had already represented Curzon Ashton in a previous round on 27 November 2012.  Curzon Ashton was reinstated to play Matlock Town in place of Witton Albion in the semi-finals.

Source:

Final
The Challenge Cup Final was played at the Throstle Nest, the home ground of Farsley F.C. This was the second consecutive Challenge Cup Final for North Ferriby United and Curzon Ashton's first Finals appearance. After a 1–1 draw, North Ferriby United went on to win the penalty shoot-out and secure their second Challenge Cup in a row while also being the third team ever to retain the Cup.

Peter Swales Shield

For the 2013 edition of the Peter Swales Shield, the 2012–13 champions of the Northern Premier League First Division North, Skelmersdale United, played against the 2012–13 champions of the Northern Premier League First Division South, King's Lynn Town.

See also

2012–13 Isthmian League
2012–13 Southern League

References

External links
Official website
Official Northern Premier League Match Photo Gallery

Northern Premier League seasons
7